The 101st Massachusetts General Court, consisting of the Massachusetts Senate and the Massachusetts House of Representatives, met in 1880 during the governorship of John Davis Long. Robert R. Bishop served as president of the Senate and Charles J. Noyes served as speaker of the House.

Senators

Representatives

See also
 1880 Massachusetts gubernatorial election
 46th United States Congress
 List of Massachusetts General Courts

References

Further reading
  (includes description of legislature)

External links
 
 

Political history of Massachusetts
Massachusetts legislative sessions
massachusetts
1880 in Massachusetts